The North Wales Wildlife Trust (NWWT) (Welsh: Ymddiriedolaeth Natur Gogledd Cymru) is the Wildlife Trust for North Wales. Established in 1962, it covers the vice counties of Anglesey, Caernarfonshire, Merionethshire, Denbighshire and Flintshire with over 4,500 members. It is a registered charity and a member of the Wildlife Trusts Partnership with the head office being located in Bangor and its eastern office located at Aberduna nature reserve, Flintshire.

Aims of the North Wales Wildlife Trust are:

To conserve north Wales' wildlife for the future.
To increase the understanding of north Wales' wildlife and its natural environment.
To apply this knowledge of practical wildlife conservation in our nature reserves and elsewhere throughout north Wales.
To enhance the enjoyment of and access to north Wales' wildlife by members of the public.

History
The history can be traced back to 1953 when two botanists RH Roberts, a local headmaster and WS "Bill" Lacey, a lecturer in University College of North Wales who carried out vegetation surveys and recommended that the fens of Cors Goch and Cors Geirch be acquired as nature reserves. In 1962 Society for the Promotion of Nature Reserves stepped in to make a holding purchase until a local conservation body could be established to buy and manage nature reserves. In 1962, 65 people met and formed The North Wales Naturalists from which a council of ten was elected with Colonel JC Wynn Finch as chairman and Dr WS Lacey as Hon Secretary. By 1965 the Trust had 359 members and three nature reserves covering just over 145 acres. Over the following years several other local Trusts would provide their reserves and assets to the North Wales Naturalists and while some larger branches would be separated to form independent Trusts; 1972 West Wales Trust formed the Meirionnydd Branch, 1982 Montgomeryshire Branch became the Montgomeryshire Trust for Nature Conservation, 1988 the Trust was renamed as the ‘North Wales Wildlife Trust’.

Bill Lacey (Lacey Lecture)
The annual Lacey Lecture, presented by the Wildlife Trust is a tradition which has been going for over 15 years. It is in memory of Professor William Lacey B.Sc., Ph.D., D.Sc., F.L.S, F.G.S  known by everyone as ‘Bill’ Lacey who achieved great academic distinction and international standing in palaeobotany. He was also an inspirational teacher and a practical man when it came to conservation. He became the Trust's first Secretary, was for 14 years chairman and then president.

He was an academic, teacher and practical conservationist of great skill and dedication and the Trust is grateful to Bill and to his family for the time and energy they have given to wildlife.

2020 Paul Allen (of CAT)
2019 Dave Goulson
2018 Philip Hoare
2017 Peter Smith (of the Wildwood Trust)
2016 Trevor Dines
2015 Nick Baker
2014 Nigel Brown
2013 Chris Baines (2nd Lecture)
2012 Natasha de Vere
2011 Mike Dilger
2010 Graham Harvey
2009 Callum Roberts
2008 Brent Elliot
2007 Paul Evans
2006 Michael Leach
2005 Aubrey Manning
2004 Jill Attenborough
2003 Iolo Williams
2002 Chris Baines
2001 Robert Swan

Reserves 
The trust manages the following 35 nature reserves (1,821 acres in total):

Abercorris	
Aberduna	
Big Pool Wood	
Blaen y Weirglodd	
Bryn Pydew	
Caeau Pen y Clip	
Caeau Tan y Bwlch	
Cemlyn Bay
Coed Cilygroeslwyd	
Coed Crafnant	
Coed Porthamel	
Coed Trellyniau	
Coed y Felin	
Cors Bodgynydd	
Cors Goch	
Cors y Sarnau	
Ddol Uchaf
Eithinog	
Gogarth	(with a trust shop on the summit complex of the Great Orme)
Gors Maen Llwyd	
Graig Wyllt	
Gwaith Powdwr	
Maes Hiraddug	
Marford Quarry	
Mariandyrys	
Minera Quarry (part of Minera SSSI)	
Morfa Bychan	
Nantporth	
Old Pulford Brook Meadows
Pisgah Quarry	
Porth Diana	
Rhiwledyn	
Spinnies, Aberogwen
Traeth Glaslyn	
Y Graig	

The Trust also runs up to three Living Landscapes projects, extending conservation work off reserves and onto private sites by working with landowners. They are currently the Alun and Chwiler, Anglesey Fens and Wrexham Industrial Estate Living Landscapes. This work improves opportunities for people and wildlife and follows the principles of bigger, better and more connected landscapes. Within the Wrexham Industrial Estate project the trust manages sites on behalf of corporate bodies, while further supporting other organisations to advise best management practices for wildlife conservation on their own land.

"We work with businesses, landholders, farmers and community groups on and around the Wrexham Industrial Estate, advising on conservation land management and improving connectivity for wildlife across one of the largest industrial areas in the UK. This involves carrying out surveys for conservation priority species, mapping habitats and drawing up management prescriptions for businesses operating on the industrial estate." - Jonny Hulson, Living Landscape Officer

Local branches
It has local members branches (who organise and lead local walks, talks and meetings), each member of the Trust will automatically become a member of their local branch, however . They are:
Anglesey Branch
Conwy Valley Branch
Arfon Branch
Clwydian Branch (covering Denbighshire and Flintshire)
Meirionydd Branch
Wrexham & Dee Valley Branch

References

External links
Official website

Wildlife Trusts of Wales
Organizations established in 1962